Rassvet is a rural locality (a village) in Fominskoye Rural Settlement, Gorokhovetsky District, Vladimir Oblast, Russia. The population was 43 as of 2010.

Geography 
Rassvet is located 42 km southwest of Gorokhovets (the district's administrative centre) by road. Rebrovo is the nearest rural locality.

References 

Rural localities in Gorokhovetsky District